Shadi Ram is an Indian National Congress politician and a former member of Delhi Legislative Assembly.

References

Delhi politicians
Indian National Congress politicians
Indian prisoners and detainees
Crime in Delhi
Living people
Year of birth missing (living people)